Slender glasswort is a common name for several plants in the genus Salicornia, and may refer to:

Salicornia depressa, native to coastal North America, for example 
Salicornia europaea, native to Europe
Salicornia maritima, native to eastern Canada